Synaptojanin 1 is a protein that in humans is encoded by the SYNJ1 gene.

Function

This gene encodes a phosphoinositide phosphatase that regulates levels of membrane phosphatidylinositol-4,5-bisphosphate. As such, expression of this enzyme may affect synaptic transmission and membrane trafficking. Multiple transcript variants encoding different isoforms have been found for this gene.

References

Further reading 

Human proteins